Željko Karaula (Bjelovar, June 26, 1973) is a Croatian historian and author. His scientific focus is on modern Croatian and Yugoslavian history, particularly the history of his hometown and the surrounding area.  He promotes the development of Croatian-Montenegrin scientific-cultural values.

Early life 
Željko Karaula was born in 1973 in Bjelovar, where he went to the School of Economics. After a year spent in the Faculty of Law in Zagreb, he enrolled and graduated from the Faculty of Philosophy of the University of Zagreb, gaining the title of professor of history and philosophy. After graduation he worked at Veliko Trojstvo Primary School near Bjelovar as a history teacher.

Career 
He started his career as an author in 1997 by publishing a collection of songs titled Vodena krila (Water Wings). In 2006, he became a director of a marketing, service, and catering company called ALCA d.o.o. Bjelovar.

He enrolled in postgraduate history studies in 2008 in the Croatian Studies department of the University of Zagreb. In 2011 he won a scholarship from the Montenegrin government for scientific research. His doctoral dissertation was Hrvatska seljačka zaštita u Kraljevini Jugoslaviji (Croatian peasant protection in the Kingdom of Yugoslavia), defended under the mentorship of Dr. Ivica Miškulin in 2015. In 2016, he was named a scientific associate, and two years later he received the Pečat grada Bjelovara (Seal of Bjelovar) prize for science. That same year, 2018, he received a prize from the Montenegrin Faculty for Literature and Linguistics in Cetinje for his contributions in nurturing Croatian-Montenegrin scientific relations.

He is an active associate of the Croatian Academy of Sciences and Arts in Bjelovar, where he is the leader of the Povijest gradova Bjelovarsko-bilogorske županije (History of the Towns of the Bjelovarsko-bilogorska County) project. He studied at the Institute for History (Sarajevo) and the Ivo Pilar Institute in Zagreb and performed research for CASA Bjelovar and the Dukljanska akademija znanosti i umjetnosti (DANU), as well as for the Montenegrin community of Croatia in archives located in Vienna, Budapest, Maribor, Belgrade, Podgorica, Cetinje, Prague, and others.

He is an associate of the DANU in Podgorica. Since 2016 he has been the main editor of a publication by the Matica hrvatska branch in Daruvar titled Zbornik Janković and a vice-president of that branch. He is also a member of the editorial board of the publication Radovi Zavoda HAZU Bjelovar. He is a member of the Družba Braća hrvatskog zmaja – Zmajski stol Bjelovar (League of Brothers of the Croatian Dragon – Dragon Table Bjelovar). The aims of this league are the spreading of patriotic, cultural, culturological, national, popular, scientific, and artistic values.

He owns a large library of books and other publications of historical content. He was a participant in numerous international and domestic scientific gatherings. He has published ten scientific monographs and ten editorial books and held a series of public lectures.

Controversy 
At the beginning of 2020, there was a dispute between Željko Karaula and the Catholic Church in Croatia because Karaula edited a transcript of diary entries by the Archbishop Alojzije Stepinac (1934-1945) created by UDBA in the 1950s, which were kept in the Croatian State Archives and became publicly available around the end of 2017. Despot Infinitus published the book in Zagreb.  The Church thought the diary to be the property of the archdiocese in Zagreb, to which Karaula responded that he only published archival materials from the Stepinac file kept in the archives: "These are publicly available materials for research, and it is not required to seek any permit by the archdiocese in Zagreb to publish such material."

Scientific monographs - selection 
HANAO - Hrvatska nacionalna omladina, Naklada Breza: Zagreb, 2011. 
Moderna povijest Bjelovara 1871–2010. Od razvojačenja Varaždinske krajine do suvremenog Bjelovara, ALCA d.o.o.- Naklada Breza: Bjelovar, 2012. 
Hrvoje, Petrić, Željko, Holjevac, Željko, Karaula, Povijest grada Bjelovara, HAZU Bjelovar-HAZU Zagreb: Zagreb-Bjelovar, 2013. (Ž. Karaula, 247.- 463.)  
Mačekova vojska. Hrvatska seljačka zaštita u Kraljevini Jugoslaviji, Despot infinitus d.o.o.: Zagreb, 2015.  
Rudolf Bićanić – intelektualac, ideolog, antifašist, ekonomist, HAZU - Zavod HAZU Bjelovar: Zagreb-Bjelovar, 2018. 
Povijest Grubišnog Polja, HAZU Bjelovar – HAZU Zagreb: Zagreb-Bjelovar, 2019.  
Političke prilike i Domovinski rat u Daruvaru (1990.-1995.), Ogranak MH Daruvar: Daruvar, 2020.  
Ratni put 105. bjelovarske brigade HV, Udruga 105. brigade Hrvatske vojske, Bjelovar, 2020. 
Sekula Drljević: 1884.-1945.: Politička biografija, Crnogorski kulturni forum - DANU, Cetinje, 2022.

References 

Living people
1973 births
21st-century Croatian historians
University of Zagreb alumni
People from Bjelovar